Magda Horváth is a Hungarian orienteering competitor. At the 1970 World Orienteering Championships in Friedrichroda she finished 19th in the individual event, and received a silver medal in the relay with the Hungarian team (with Ágnes Hegedűs and Sarolta Monspart). At the 1972 World Championships she finished 8th in the individual event, and fourth in the relay.

References

Year of birth missing (living people)
Living people
Hungarian orienteers
Female orienteers
Foot orienteers
World Orienteering Championships medalists